USS Firecrest is a name used more than once by the U.S. Navy:

 , a coastal minesweeper placed in service on 4 April 1941
 Firecrest was the name assigned on 17 May 1945 to the minesweeper designated AM-394, but the ship was never built
 , formerly YMS-231 was reclassified 17 February 1947

United States Navy ship names